The Odd-Job Men is a 2021 Spanish-French comedy-drama film directed by Neus Ballús which stars Mohamed Mellali, Valero Escolar and Pep Sarrà.

Plot 
A dramedy blurring the limits between a fiction film and a documentary, the film exposes racist prejudices in the Catalan society. It tracks the day-to-day life of three plumbers/electricians (performed by semi-professional actors) in the outskirts of Barcelona. It features dialogue in Spanish, Catalan and Amazigh.

Cast

Production 
The screenplay was penned by the director Neus Ballús alongside 'Margarita Melgar' (a collective pseudonym for Montse Ganges and Ana Sanz-Magallón).

The film was produced by Distinto Films and El Kinògraf alongside Slot Machine, with the participación of RTVE, TVC, Movistar+ and support from ICAA and ICEC.

Release 

The film had its world premiere at the 74th Locarno Film Festival (LFF) in August 2021. It also screened at the 46th Toronto International Film Festival (September 2021), the 26th Busan International Film Festival (online, October 2021), the 66th Valladolid International Film Festival (October 2021) and the 13th CiBRA Festival in Toledo (November 2021). Distributed by Filmax, it was theatrically released in Spain on 3 December 2021.

Reception 
The review aggregator website Rotten Tomatoes reported a 93% approval rating, based on 14 reviews with an average rating of 7.40/10.

Beatriz Martínez of El Periódico de Catalunya gave the film 5 out of 5 stars, deeming it to be a "film made out of commitment and vindication that is so full of nobility and that is capable, through its humour and humanity, of connecting in such a sincere way with the audience".

Àlex Montoya of Fotogramas gave it 4 out of 5 stars highlighting the light tone and the charisma displayed by the three leads.

Sergi Sánchez of La Razón gave it 3 out of 5 stars, praising the performances by the semi-professional actors, while negatively considering that the underlying thesis behind the film is laid out "with excessive naivety".

Jessica Kiang of Variety considered it as a "charming, slight yet sharp Spanish odd-couple comedy".

Awards and nominations 

|-
| align = "center" rowspan = "5" | 2021 || rowspan = "2" | 74th Locarno Film Festival || Leopard for Best Actor || Mohamed Mellali & Valero Escolar ||  || rowspan = "2" | 
|-
| colspan = "2" | Europa Cinemas Label ||  
|-
| rowspan = "2" | 66th Valladolid International Film Festival || colspan = "2" | Silver Spike ||  || align = "center" rowspan = "2" | 
|-
| colspan = "2" | People's Choice Award || 
|-
| 13th  || colspan = "2" | People's Choice Award ||  || 
|-
| align = "center" rowspan = "11" | 2022 || 9th Feroz Awards || colspan = "2" | Best Comedy Film ||  || 
|-
| rowspan = "10" | 14th Gaudí Awards || colspan = "2" | Best Film ||  || rowspan = "10" | 
|-
| Best Direction || Neus Ballús || 
|-
| Best Screenplay || Neus Ballús, Margarita Melgar || 
|-
| Best Actor || Mohamed Mellali || 
|-
| Best Production Supervision || Bernat Rifé, Goretti Pagès || 
|-
| Best Editing || Neus Ballús, Ariadna Ribas || 
|-
| Best Supporting Actor || Valero Escolar || 
|-
| Best Costume Design || Alba Costa || 
|-
| Best Sound || Amanda Villavieja, Elena Coderch, Albert Manera || 
|-
| colspan = "2" | Public's Choice Special Award for Best Film || 
|}

See also 
 List of Spanish films of 2021

References

External links 
 The Odd-Job Men at ICAA's Catálogo de Cinespañol

2021 films
2021 comedy-drama films
Filmax films
2020s Catalan-language films
Films set in Catalonia
Spanish comedy-drama films
French comedy-drama films
2020s Spanish-language films
2020s Arabic-language films
Films about racism in Spain
2021 multilingual films
Spanish multilingual films
French multilingual films
2020s Spanish films
2020s French films